The Academia Sinica Institute of Astronomy and Astrophysics (also known as the Institute of Astronomy and Astrophysics, abbreviated as ASIAA or IAA. ) is a research institute of the national academy of Taiwan, Academia Sinica.

ASIAA is currently located in the Astronomy and Mathematics Building at the National Taiwan University in Taipei, Taiwan and also has a field office in Hilo, Hawaii.

ASIAA was officially established on June 1, 2010, with Paul Ho being the first director.

Research 
The research areas of ASIAA range from the Solar System to star formation to galaxies and cosmology. ASIAA has either led or co-led the construction and operation of several telescopes, including the AMiBA Telescope to study the cosmic microwave background radiation (also known as "Lee Array"), the Taiwanese-American Occultation Survey, the Submillimeter Array and many other research projects.

Projects 
ASIAA is involved in several research projects, including:

 Taiwanese–American Occultation Survey (TAOS)
 Transneptunian Automated Occultation Survey (TAOS II)
 Yuan Tseh Lee Array for Microwave Background Anisotropy (AMiBA)
 Theoretical Institute for Advanced Research in Astrophysics (TIARA)
 Hyper Suprime-Cam (HSC) Survey
 Atacama Large Millimeter/submillimeter Array (ALMA)
 The Greenland Telescope
 Space Infrared Telescope for Cosmology and Astrophysics (SPICA)

Observatories 
ASIAA has access to several observatories:

 Submillimeter Array (SMA)
 Canada-France-Hawaii Telescope (CFHT)
 Subaru Telescope
The Greenland Telescope

Directors

Directors for the re-establishment of ASIAA 

Typhoon Lee (1993–1994)
 Chi Yuan (1994–1997)
  (1997 – 2002 August)
  (September 2002 – August 2003)
Sun Kwok (September 2003 – 2005 August)
 Paul Ho (September 2005 – May 2010)

Directors of ASIAA 

 Paul Ho (June 2010 – August 2014)
 You-Hua Chu (September 2014 – August 2020)
 Shiang-Yu Wang (Acting Director) (September 2020 – August 2021)
 Ue-Li Pen (September 2021 – present)

Education and public outreach
public with latest astronomical research results by broadcasting videos—some are in-house produced, some with English -->Chinese subtitles translated.]]Academia Sinica Headquarters organizes its Open House Day annually in late October or November to raise awareness and interest in science among the public. All of the 31 institutes of the Academia Sinica actively participate in educational entertainment programs.

See also
 Academia Sinica

External links 
 Academia Sinica Institute of Astronomy and Astrophysics 
 Advanced Theoretical Astrophysics Research Centre
 

2010 establishments in Taiwan
Academia Sinica
Research institutes established in 2010
Space program of Taiwan